This is a list of years in Croatia. See also the timeline of Croatian history. Each article deals with events in Croatia in a given year.

19th century

20th century

21st century

See also
 Timeline of Croatian history
 History of Croatia
 List of years by country

Cities in Croatia
 Timeline of Rijeka
 Timeline of Split
 Timeline of Zagreb

 
Croatia history-related lists
Croatia